Maxime Rooney (born April 16, 1998) is a retired American competitive swimmer who won the gold medal in the 200 meter freestyle at the 2015 FINA World Junior Swimming Championships in Singapore. Together with his teammates, he broke the junior world record in the  freestyle relay.

At the senior 2015 National Championships (long course) in San Antonio, Rooney won the title in the 200 meter freestyle. His winning time of 1:47.10 was the former junior world record.

Personal life

Rooney is half Filipino and has dual citizenship.

References

External links
 
 

1998 births
Living people
American male freestyle swimmers
American sportspeople of Filipino descent
Universiade medalists in swimming
Universiade gold medalists for the United States
Universiade silver medalists for the United States
Medalists at the 2017 Summer Universiade